General Baird was built in Rangoon in 1801 or 1802 as a "country ship", that is, a British ship that traded east of the Cape of Good Hope. Her master was W. Fleming, and her owner Fairlie, Gilmore and Company.

In 1803 Lord Wellesley, Governor-General of India, had decided upon the resettlement of Balambangan Island and instructed R. J. Farquhar, the British Resident at Amboina, to manage the expedition. 

The expedition sailed from Malacca on 29 August. 

Farquhar reestablished the settlement at Balambangan by the end of September 1803.
 
A fire on 29 October 1803 destroyed General Baird, Captain Fleming, master, in the harbour at Balambangan. She caught fire and burned to the water's edge.

Post script: The British burnt their fort and village and withdrew from Balambangan on 5 December 1806.

Citations

References
 
 
 

1801 ships
British ships built in India
Age of Sail merchant ships of England
Maritime incidents in 1803
Ship fires
Shipwrecks in the South China Sea